Sir David Miller Barbour  (28 December 1841 – 12 November 1928) was a British writer and civil servant in British India.

Barbour was born at Calkill House near Omagh. He was educated at Omagh Academy and Queens College Belfast. On graduating he took the ICS examination, placing sixth overall and first in mathematics. When in India he served at all times in the Finance branch ending as Financial Member of the Viceroy's council. He was created a Knight Commander of the Order of the Star of India (KCSI) for his services in India, and subsequently Knight Commander of the Order of St Michael and St George (KCMG) on 17 July 1899 for his various financial services to the British Government. He was a Financial Member of the Indian Viceroy's Council under Henry Petty-Fitzmaurice, 5th Marquess of Lansdowne, writer on monetary issues, and Irish loyalist. From 1903 to 1905 he was chairman of the Royal Commission on London Traffic. He was the father of Nevill Barbour.

References 

B. R. Tomlinson, ‘Barbour, Sir David Miller (1841–1928)’, Oxford Dictionary of National Biography, Oxford University Press, 2004; online edn, Jan 2012 
S. Ambirajan, Political economy and monetary management: India, 1766–1914 (1984)
B. R. Tomlinson, The political economy of the raj, 1914–1947 (1979) · DNB · CGPLA Eng. & Wales (1928)

External links
 
 

1841 births
1928 deaths
Indian Civil Service (British India) officers
Knights Commander of the Order of St Michael and St George
Knights Commander of the Order of the Star of India